HMS Orlando has been the name of four ships of the Royal Navy.

 was a 36-gun fifth rate launched in 1811, used for harbour service or as a hospital from 1819 and sold in 1824.
 was a wood screw frigate launched in 1858 and sold in 1871.
 was an  armoured cruiser launched in 1886 and scrapped in 1905.
HMS Orlando was to have been a  destroyer, but was renamed  prior to being launched in 1913.
 was a World War II shore establishment and gunnery school at Navy house, Greenock, Scotland.

References

Royal Navy ship names